BAER may refer to:

 Burned area emergency response
 Brainstem auditory evoked response

See also
 Baer, surname of German origin